Jayne Ashton (born 31 August 1957) is a former English professional squash player.

Ashton was born on 31 August 1957 in Birmingham. She was first capped for England in 1973, the year she became British Junior Champion. She competed as a top-sixteen seeded player at the British Open Squash Championships but her greatest achievement was being part of the winning England team during the 1979 Women's World Team Squash Championships.

References

External links
 

English female squash players
1957 births
Living people